Cornelius Theodore Jordan (December 30, 1855 – January 28, 1924) was an American educator and politician who served as a member of the Virginia Senate, representing the state's 9th district. In 1915, he ran for Senate as an Independent, defeating Democratic incumbent William H. Landes. After caucusing with the chamber's Democrats during his four-year term, he won the party's nomination in 1919 but was bested in the general election by Independent F. Percy Loth. From 1896 to 1899, he was the President of New Mexico College of Agriculture and Mechanic Arts, which would later become New Mexico State University.

References

External links
 
 

1855 births
1924 deaths
Presidents of New Mexico State University
Virginia Independents
Virginia state senators
People from Salem, Virginia
Roanoke College alumni